Taunggyi is the capital and largest city of Shan State, Myanmar (Burma) and lies on the Thazi-Kyaingtong road at an elevation of , just north of Shwenyaung and Inle Lake within the Myelat region. Taunggyi is the fifth largest city of Myanmar, and has an estimated population of 380,665 as of 2014. The city is famous for its hot air balloon festival held annually on the full moon day of Tazaungmon.

Etymology 
The name Taunggyi means "huge mountain" in the Burmese language, and is named after the ridge on the east of the city, part of the Shan Hills system, whose prominent high point is called Taung-chun or "The Spur." Locally this spur is popularly known as Phaya Taung. The ridge has a more prominent and more popular feature known as Chauk Talone, meaning the Craigs.

History 
Prior to British colonisation, Taunggyi was a small village of a few huts. The area lay on a wide shoulder of the Sittaung Hills of the Shan Hills and was populated by the Shan people at the time. The signs of the original village of Taunggyi are long gone, but nearby villages can still be discerned quite easily.

During British occupation, the town became the chief city and capital of the Southern Shan States. Taunggyi's modern development began in 1894, when the British moved their administrative offices from Maing Thauk (Fort Stedman) on the eastern shores of Inle Lake to the higher elevation of Taunggyi, for health and geographical reasons. Although geographically within the state of Yawnghwe, the town was denoted as a "notified area" by the British, exempt from the Sawbwa's administration.  By 1906, there existed a thousand houses. Because of civil unrest throughout the Shan States during the early 1900s, Taunggyi served as the chief garrison for military police. Taunggyi also served as a supply centre for the Shan States, and catered to persons of many nationalities.

Geography

It sits on a high intermontaine basin (erroneously called a plateau) that rapidly descends to the western lowland river valleys that make up central Myanmar, but is otherwise surrounded by mountain range.

Climate

Taunggyi has a humid subtropical climate (Köppen climate classification Cwa), closely bordering a subtropical highland climate (Cwb). There is a winter dry season (December–March) and a summer wet-season (April–November). Temperatures are very warm throughout the year; the winter months (December–February) are milder but the nights can be quite cool.

Transportation
The main access to Taunggyi is by the mountainous road.  A railway line that passes through Taunggyi was recently built in 1995, but at the moment it offers no passenger service to Taunggyi. Regular railway passenger service to the rest of the country is through the town of Shwenyaung,  to the west.  The nearest airport is Heho Airport,  about an hour driving distance, by road to the west of Taunggyi. Heho Airport has regular flights to Yangon, Mandalay and Bagan.

Culture

Taunggyi is the melting pot for the Myelat area of the Shan State. Like in most of Myanmar, influence of Buddhism is most evidenced by the monasteries scattered throughout the city.  However, being a relatively new city, the monasteries are not of historical significance and architecturally not unique.  There is also a significant Christian population, as the center of the Roman Catholic Archdiocese of Taunggyi the St. Joseph's Cathedral and its associated seminary are the main facilities, as well as a Baptist church. Both churches were established by early missionaries.  There is also a smaller Anglican church, which originally served the British administrators, but recently it has fallen into a state of disrepair.  Four mosques serve the Muslim communities of the city. Among four mosques, Panthay mosque serves the Chinese Panthay Muslims mainly. The other mosques are for large population of Burmese Muslims.  There are also a few temples serving the Chinese Buddhist community. After 1990s, Chinese migrants are settling in Taunggyi and now they constitute the considerable proportion in communities.

The Taunggyi celebration of the Tazaungdaing Festival, a national holiday marking the end of the rainy season, has achieved international notoriety.
"...balloons with large fireworks displays attached are sent airborne - but if they don't rise quickly enough, the pyrotechnics rocket back towards to crowds - sending people scattering. Videos of balloons engulfed in flames exploding amongst onlookers have become wildly popular on YouTube." There were nine people injured in 2018, 
two deaths and 12 injuries in 2017, and
four deaths in 2014.

Being the capital of the Shan State, Taunggyi hosts many government offices. The city also hosts Eastern Command of the Tatmadaw (Myanmar military) and it occupies a significant portion of the north-east area of the city. Shan State Cultural Museum lies in Taunggyi. The museum displays the Shan culture, as well as items of historical interest, such as the belongings of Sawbwa.

Economy

Tourism 
The Taunggyi area is a popular tourist destination.  The city itself has an interesting five-day market, where farmers from around the area would come to the Taunggyi on market day and sell fresh produce in the open market, but with more development of the city, the significance of market day has been lessened.  However, the market-day tradition continues strong in the outlying small towns.  Nearby, Inle Lake is the home of the unique Intha culture.  Inlay is famous for its traditional crafts industry and floating markets that are accessible via traditional longboats. The most unique thing is that Intha row the boat with their leg. On the way to the Pindaya Caves provides visitors with a good view of the Myelat countryside. Near Taunggyi, in Kekku, there are hundreds of stupas which dates back to 16th century.

Industry 
There is no significant industry in Taunggyi.  It used to be the trans-shipment point for many of the agricultural products of southern Shan State.  However, due to recently imposed zoning regulations, most of these operations have been moved to the surrounding new town of Ayetharyar.

Agriculture 

Another economy of Taunggyi is farming and gardening. Farmers around Taunggyi are mostly Shan and Pa-O ethnic origins. The main agricultural products of Taunggyi are potatoes, tea leaf, tomato, beans, damson and seasonal fruits.

Education 
The city is home to:
 Taunggyi University 
 University of Computer Studies, Taunggyi
 University of Medicine, Taunggyi 
 Technological University, Taunggyi
 Taunggyi Education College

Sports 
The 7,000-seat Taunggyi Stadium is a multi-use stadium in Taunggyi. The stadium is the home ground of Shan United FC, a Myanmar National League (MNL) football club.

Health care

Public Hospitals 
 Sao San Tun General Hospital
 Taunggyi Women and Children Hospital
Taunggyi University Hospital
 Mettashin Charity Hospital-Eye Care Services

Gallery

Notes

References

Township capitals of Myanmar
Populated places in Taunggyi District
Taunggyi Township